Guna 369 is a 2019 Telugu-language action drama film written and directed by Arjun Jandyala and stars Kartikeya and Anagha. Anil Kadiyala and Tirumal Reddy produced the film under the banner "SG Movie Makers". The soundtrack was composed by Chaitan Bharadwaj, who also composed Kartikeya's RX 100. The film is based on a true story and was released on 2 August 2019 to mixed reviews from critics.

Plot

Gaddala Gunta Radha gets revenge on a villager who killed a member of Radha's gang by assaulting the man's parents. He then warns nearby villagers that anyone who disrespects him will suffer the same consequences.

Then, a man walks into a medical shop to purchase condoms. The shop owner takes a photo of the man and his girlfriend leaving on a scooter and sends it to Sashi's gang, who later tracks the couple down and rapes the girl.

Guna is a non-violent man who works with his closest friend Battu at a granite factory. While riding a scooter to attend to his B. Tech exams, Guna meets Geetha and falls in love with her at first sight.

Guna repeatedly causes his phone to malfunction to see Geetha, who works at a phone store. Guna gives Geetha compliments, who eventually reciprocates his love.

Guna finds an online photo of Sashi, who attended school with Butta. Guna believes that Sashi may be a good romantic match for his sister. Guna and his sister visit Sashi at the medical shop Sashi owns. After the visit, Guna is convinced that Sashi is a good man and a perfect match for his sister.

At a dhaba, Sashi and his gang get into a brawl with Radha; they flee when they realise it is Radha. When Sashi learns that Guna has known Radha since childhood, he pleads for Guna’s help. Guna agrees and arranges a meeting with Radha at the granite quarry so that Sashi can apologize to Radha.

Radha arrives alone and viciously slaps Sashi across the face several times as Guna asks Radha to stop. Unbeknownst to Guna or Radha, Sashi’s gang had planned to kill Radha in an ambush. As Sashi's gang holds Guna down, Sashi beheads Radha, and Guna is later jailed for being an accessory to the murder, while Sashi avoids charges.

Guna is shunned by his neighbours when he is released. Guna goes to Geetha’s house and learns she died while he was imprisoned. Her father falsely tells Guna that Geetha renounced their engagement before she died, and stating she did not want to marry a felon. At home, an enraged Guna tells his father that he will take revenge on Radha's real killers. He visits Geetha's house, where he and his family are attacked by Radha’s henchmen. Although Guna prevails, his father is injured and ends up in the hospital. Guna brings Radha's men to Radha’s mother, where he explains to her that he did not kill her son. Radha's mother gives Guna one week to bring Sashi's gang to her.

Guna finds Sashi’s men hiding in a police house and attacks them. Guna calls his father to tell him that he will go back to jail for what he is about to do to the Sashi gang. Battu berates Guna, advising him to hand the killers over to Radha's mother instead.

Guna reveals that the SI said Battu had encouraged Sashi to kill Radha, as Radha humiliated his family; he was the villager whose parents were beaten. Guna says he also learned that Geetha had come to Battu for advice about her father’s insistence to marry someone else. Instead of advising her, Battu and Sashi recorded all of them raping her. Fearing the consequences of the video’s release and the potential for blackmail, Geetha committed suicide.

Forced by Guna, SI films Guna beheading Sashi’s six gang members and dismembering Sashi and Battu. Guna surrenders to the police but is praised for killing the rapists. Guna is eventually released from jail.

Cast

Soundtrack 
Music is composed by Chaitan Bharadwaj.

Reception 
The Hans India described the film as average. The newspaper noted problems with the storyline and described it as a "routine commercial formula".

Neeshita Nyayapati of Times of India gave the movie a score of 2 out of 5 and wrote, ″With every story of Karthikeya different from his last, Guna 369 is one such attempt where he tries to pick a script and character that he hasn’t done before. But unfortunately for him, these films also depend on the director’s narrative, which is where his latest offering falters.″

References

External links 

Guna 369 on Netflix

2010s Telugu-language films
2019 action drama films
Indian action drama films
2019 films
Indian films based on actual events
Action drama films based on actual events
Indian films about revenge
Films about rape in India
Films scored by Chaitan Bharadwaj